Halloween: The Curse of Michael Myers  is a 1995 American slasher film directed by Joe Chappelle and written by Daniel Farrands, and is the sixth installment in the Halloween film series. Taking place six years after Halloween 5: The Revenge of Michael Myers, the plot depicts Michael Myers stalking adoptive relatives of his sister, Laurie Strode, who are living in his childhood home, as he hunts down the infant son of his niece, Jamie Lloyd (J.C. Brandy). The film marks the final appearance of Donald Pleasence as Dr. Sam Loomis before his death, as well as the feature film debut of Paul Rudd, who portrays a now adult Tommy Doyle from the original Halloween (1978).

Shot in Salt Lake City in the fall of 1994, Halloween: The Curse of Michael Myers had a reported troubled production. Its original cut performed poorly with test audiences, leading to the film undergoing a series of reshoots and edits. The finished film was distributed by Dimension Films, who would go on to distribute the rest of the series until 2018's Halloween. Pleasance died on February 2, 1995, nearly eight months before the film was released. The film was dedicated to his memory. 

Halloween: The Curse of Michael Myers was released on September 29, 1995, but was a box office flop, grossing $15.1 million at the domestic box office on a budget of $5 million, and was lambasted by critics, with criticism focused on its weak story, ending, and Rudd’s performance, as well as the portrayal and mask of Michael Myers, though Pleasance’s performance was better received.

After the film's home media release, the original workprint of the film, which featured 45 minutes of alternative footage and a different ending, was discovered by fans of the series. This version, dubbed the Producer's Cut, developed a cult following, with bootleg DVD copies sold on eBay and online petitions targeting for an official release of it. In 2014, the Producer's Cut was officially released on Blu-ray.

Halloween: The Curse of Michael Myers was followed by Halloween H20: 20 Years Later in 1998, which does not contain any references to the Jamie Lloyd storyline of the prior three films (although they were featured in the original script and comic book tie-ins published by Chaos! Comics), instead serving as a direct sequel to Halloween II (1981).

Plot
Six years after the previous film, Michael Myers and his niece Jamie Lloyd have been abducted by the Man in Black, the leader of a Druid-like cult. On Halloween Eve, fifteen-year-old Jamie gives birth to a child and manages to escape with a help of a midwife who is killed by Michael. Jamie and her baby flee in a stolen pickup truck with Michael in pursuit.

Meanwhile, a now retired Dr. Loomis is visited by his friend Dr. Terence Wynn, the chief administrator of Smith's Grove Sanitarium, where Michael had been incarcerated as a boy. As Wynn asks Loomis to return to Smith's Grove, they overhear Jamie's plea for help on a local radio station. Michael catches up with Jamie and kills her, but finds that the baby is not in the truck.

In Haddonfield, Tommy Doyle, whom Laurie Strode babysat in 1978, is now a recluse obsessed with finding the truth behind Michael's motives. He lives across the street from the old Myers house, now owned by relatives of Laurie's adoptive family: Kara Strode, her younger brother Tim, caring mother Debra, abusive father John, and six-year-old son Danny, who is tormented by visions of the Man in Black telling him to commit murder.

Tommy finds Jamie's baby at a bus station and takes him to the hospital, where he runs into Loomis and tells him about the Strodes. Loomis warns Debra that Michael will return to his childhood home, but she is killed before she can leave. Tommy takes Kara and Danny to the boarding house where he lives, and tells Kara about Thorn, an ancient Druid curse that drives a person to kill their family on Halloween. Jamie's baby, whom Tommy has named Steven, would be Michael's final sacrifice.

Tommy leaves to meet up with Loomis, while Michael kills the other Strodes as they return to the Myers house. Mrs. Blankenship, the owner of the boarding house, reveals to Kara that she was babysitting Michael the night he killed his sister and that Danny hears the same voice that Michael did, indicating that the curse will pass on to Danny if Steven is killed. Tommy and Loomis return just in time to save Kara and Danny from an encounter with Michael. The Man in Black appears and is revealed to be Dr. Wynn. Thorn cult members burst in and, with the help of Mrs. Blankenship, abduct Kara, Danny, and Steven and take them to Smith's Grove. Kara is locked in a maximum-security ward while the boys are kept in an operating room.

Tommy and Loomis go to the sanitarium where Loomis confronts Wynn, who reveals that the Smith's Grove staff have been studying the power of Thorn through DNA experiments to learn how to control it. Steven is implied to be the successful result of in vitro fertilization to clone Michael's pure evil. Wynn wants Loomis to join in on his conspiracy, as he was the first to see the evil inside Michael. Loomis refuses and is knocked out by a doctor. Meanwhile, Tommy frees Kara as Michael pursues them through the sanitarium. They find Wynn and his team, who are about to perform a medical procedure on Danny and Steven. Michael suddenly appears and turns against the cult, killing them all.

Tommy and Kara rescue the kids as Michael chases them into a laboratory containing fetuses from Wynn's failed experiments. Tommy injects Michael with corrosive liquid and beats him unconscious with a lead pipe. Tommy, Kara, and the children leave Smith's Grove while Loomis stays behind to take care of some business. Inside, Michael's mask lies alone on the lab floor as Loomis screams in the background, leaving their fates unknown.

Producer's Cut ending

After being abducted, Kara awakens strapped to an altar. Wynn conducts a ceremony witnessed by the cult, which is composed of several Haddonfield residents. Michael is to kill Steven, who is his biological child as a result of raping Jamie, after which Danny will become the new Thorn bearer and begin his own killing spree by sacrificing Kara. Tommy intervenes and uses runes of light to stop Michael in his tracks as Loomis helps Kara and the children escape. After the others leave, Loomis returns to the sanitarium where he finds what appears to be Michael lying on the ground. Upon removing the mask, however, he discovers that Michael switched clothes with Wynn and escaped. Wynn passes on the role of Michael's guardian to Loomis, who screams in despair upon seeing the Thorn symbol appear on his wrist.

Cast

 Donald Pleasence as Dr. Sam Loomis
 Paul Rudd as Tommy Doyle (credited as Paul Stephen Rudd)
 Marianne Hagan as Kara Strode
 Mitch Ryan as Dr. Terence Wynn
 Devin Gardner as Danny Strode
 J. C. Brandy as Jamie Lloyd
 Danielle Harris as young Jamie Lloyd (archive footage, The Producer's Cut only)
 Keith Bogart as Tim Strode
 Mariah O'Brien as Beth
 Kim Darby as Debra Strode
 Bradford English as John Strode
 Leo Geter as Barry Simms
 Susan Swift as Nurse Mary
 George P. Wilbur as Michael Myers
 Janice Knickrehm as Mrs. Blankenship
 Alan Echeverria as Dr. Bonham
 Hildur Ruriks as Dawn
 Sheri Hicks as Paramedic
 Tom Proctor as Motorist
 Bryan Morris as Attendant
 Lee Ju Chew as Nurse
 Raquelle Anderson as Ballerina
 Kristine Summers as College Coed
 Elyse Donalson as Lunatic
 A. Michael Lerner as Additional Shape
 Jimmy Chunga as Drunk College Student
 Brad Hardin as The Shape - Second Unit additional photography
 Fred Lerner as Smith's Grove Doctor
 James Woodson as Deputy

Production

Concept and writing

After the less than enthusiastic response to Halloween 5: The Revenge of Michael Myers which came out only a year after Halloween 4: The Return of Michael Myers, producer Moustapha Akkad put the series on hold to re-evaluate its potential. Akkad felt Halloween 5 had strayed too far from Halloween 4 and the box office response was much lower than expected. As early as 1990, both Danielle Harris and Don Shanks were expected to return as Jamie Lloyd and The Shape, with the possibility of Donald Pleasence and Wendy Kaplan reprising their roles as well. That same year, screenwriter and long-time Halloween fan Daniel Farrands set out to write the sixth entry in the Halloween series. Farrands gave his horror film scripts to the producer of Halloween 5, Ramsey Thomas; impressed by his writing, Thomas set a meeting for Farrands with executive producer Moustapha Akkad. Farrands described the meeting:

Farrands, who knew the films, as well as Dennis Etchison's novelizations intimately, constructed a bible of the entire franchise and presented it to the studio. The film lingered in development as a planned October 1990 release was missed, but Akkad persisted and began courting Michele Soavi in 1992. Soavi would reject the offer and not long after the producers entered a series of complicated legal battles ensued which delayed plans for a sequel; eventually Miramax Films (via its Dimension Films division) bought the rights to the Halloween series. Concurrently with the legal battle, series co-creator John Carpenter had teamed up with New Line Cinema to outbid Miramax. Carpenter's proposal saw the film take place on a space station. The idea may have been referenced in a scene in which a conspiracy theorist calls Barry Sims's radio show ranting about the CIA launching Michael Myers into space. The rejected premise might also have inspired the plot for Jason X. With Miramax on board, the studio hoped to start production by October 1993, but yet again, this did not materialize. Instead, Bob Weinstein hired Gary Fleder to helm the film. Fleder recommended Phil Rosenberg, who became the first writer hired for the film. His script, titled Halloween 666: The Origin, was hated by Akkad, who tossed the script across his room after he finished reading it. However, Miramax responded favorably to Rosenberg's work and opted to continue moving forward until Fleder would drop off of the film citing "creative differences". Hot off the success of Pulp Fiction, Quentin Tarantino was approached to write and direct the film. Tarantino would decline but instead suggested Evil Dead II co-writer Scott Spiegel to direct the film instead. Tarantino's planned script would have involved Michael Myers and the Man in Black fleeing Haddonfield together and going on a road trip down Route 66 while murdering people, but he was never officially hired and Spiegel later departed the project. Tarantino's rejected ideas bear a resemblance with his screenplay for Natural Born Killers, which he was pitching to Miramax Films at the same time as he was considering ideas for a screenplay for Halloween 6. According to the commentary track from the Producer's Cut of the film, while Tarantino was considered in the early stages of production, the story that Tarantino had ever actually completed a script is an urban legend. Roger Avary was also unsuccessful in pitching for the film. Spiegel was unenthusiastic about Rosenberg's screenplay and struggled to perform the script polish he was assigned. He would ultimately depart the project. By April 1994, Phil's brother, Scott Rosenberg was tasked with revising the script, but failed to satisfy Akkad.

Other concepts involved Michael being found to be Dr. Loomis's son or Michael's mother being kept as a sex slave by the Man in Black.

With Rosenberg's draft now dead in the water by the end of April, the studio pursued upcoming writers Irving Belateche and Lawrence Guterman to completely overhaul Halloween 666. With an October 1994 release window instilled by Weinstein, Matthew Patrick of Hider in the House was selected as director. Upon his hiring, Patrick immediately flew down to Salt Lake City for location scouting and brought in his frequent cinematographer Billy Dickson. However, neither Patrick or Akkad were appeased by the script, with the former even referring to it as "unfinished". Patrick was granted his own revision of the script, but tensions rose between Akkad and Weinstein. With production gearing up to begin in two weeks without a finalized cast, Patrick would ultimately quit the project in May 1994. In June 1994, Farrands was hired to write a new screenplay, as the film had an impending shooting date scheduled for October in Salt Lake City, Utah. At this time, Fred Walton, best known for directing When a Stranger Calls and April Fool's Day, was attached to direct the film. Walton shortly became reluctant on taking on a "movie about a guy with a knife killing people". Instead, the filmmaker envisioned a plot akin to Friday the 13th: A New Beginning, with Jamie Llyod living in a halfway house and committing suicide in the film's opening scene. The Weinsteins swiftly moved onto Joe Chappelle after being impressed with his debut film, Thieves Quartet. Farrands has said his initial intent for the film was to "bridge the later films (4–5) in the series to the earlier films (1–2) while at the same time taking the story into new territory so that the series could expand for future installments." This in part meant expanding on the presence of the "Man in Black" as well as the appearance of the Thorn symbol, both of which appear without explanation at the end of Halloween 5. In beginning the script, Farrands contacted the writers of Halloween 4 and 5 for additional information, but they were unable to provide clear answers, leaving him to "pick up the pieces."

Farrands expanded the "Curse of Thorn" plot line, in which Jamie Lloyd is kidnapped by a covert cult who has cursed Michael Myers via the Runic symbol of Thorn, which compels him to kill and also affords him immortality. Farrands had in part based the idea on dialogue present in Halloween II (1981) about the night of Samhain, during which the "veil between the living and the dead is thinnest," the one time of the year during which Myers became "active, and seeks out his bloodline." References to Druidism as well as Myers's grandfather "hearing voices" had also appeared in the 1978 novelization of Halloween by Curtis Richards. While the character of Jamie Lloyd dies early in the film, the initial versions of Farrands' script had her character surviving until the final act, at which point she was ultimately killed by Michael. Other elements of Farrands' working script that ultimately had to be trimmed down included an extension of the Curse of Thorn subplot, which had the entire town of Haddonfield in collusion with the cult, an idea Akkad wanted to use for the series' seventh installment. However, this idea was scrapped in favor of the Halloween H20 script in 1997.

According to Farrands, there were around ten different drafts of his script between June 1994 and the October 1994 film shoot   and much of the finale that appears in the theatrical version (including the events at the hospital, as well as the references to the cult using Myers's power as a means of scientific investigation), was not written by him, and had been written and shot in post-production under the supervision of Dimension Films.

Farrands compares Tommy's arc in that film to Laurie Strode's in Halloween H20: that of a traumatized victim who must stop running and face their worst fear. He claims that this was supposed to be more obvious, with flashbacks to the original film, but the development of the film resulted in many of those scenes being lost. Farrands says that he brought Tommy back as a way of bridging the gap between the sequels and the first film. His intent was for Tommy to be the successor to Dr. Loomis, to act as a "voice of sanity...a kind of modern Van Helsing, the fearless Michael hunter!", a role he believed was missing from H20 and Resurrection.

Originally, Kara's fate varied in various script drafts. In the first draft, Kara is murdered by her son Danny in the Haddonfield Bus Depot, while the near final draft had the film ending with Tommy and Kara driving away. The film as released ends with Kara and Tommy driving off with the children, Danny and Stephen.

Farrands describes Michael as a "sexual deviant". According to him, the way Michael follows girls around and watches them contains a subtext of repressed sexuality. Farrands theorizes that, as a child, Michael became fixated on the murder of his sister Judith, and for his own twisted reasons felt the need to repeat that action over and over again, finding a sister-like figure in Laurie who excited him sexually. He also believes that by making Laurie Michael's literal sister, the sequels took away from the simplicity and relatability of the original Halloween. Nevertheless, when writing Curse, Farrands was tasked with creating a mythology for Michael which defined his motives and why he could not be killed. He says, "He can't just be a man anymore, he's gone beyond that. He's mythical. He's supernatural. So, I took it from that standpoint that there's something else driving him. A force that goes beyond that five senses that has infected this boy's soul and now is driving him." As the script developed and more people became involved, Farrands admits that the film went too far in explaining Michael Myers and that he himself was not completely satisfied with the finished product.

Allusions and references
Farrands, a long-time fan of the series, sought to incorporate various references and allusions to the previous Halloween films, particularly the original, to play with the "Halloween mythology." These range from situational allusions, such as Tommy Doyle living across the street from the Strode house (a play on the events in the original Halloween, which take place between the Wallace and Doyle residences, which are across the street from one another) to minor references, such as the naming of an address from Halloween II (1981), and the character of Mrs. Blankenship, a name referred to in passing in Halloween III: Season of the Witch (1982). Other references outside the narrative diegeses of the series include the names of characters, such as John and Debra Strode (referencing John Carpenter and Debra Hill), as well as the naming of Danny Strode, a character Farrands has said was modeled after Danny Torrance in The Shining (1980).

Farrands also referenced Carpenter's The Fog (1980) with the line referring to a "stomach pounder" (a protein milkshake Tim drinks early in the film), and Beth's murder scene was modeled after a scene from Fred Walton's When a Stranger Calls (1979) (Farrands wrote the scene upon hearing that Walton had been attached to direct the project, though Walton would eventually drop out of the production). Additionally, extended scenes of Kara walking on the college campus and en route to her home were intended to allude to scenes featuring Laurie Strode in the first film, while Danny dropping his pumpkin while walking home alludes to a scene in the first film in which a group of bullies force Tommy to drop his pumpkin outside the elementary school.

Casting

Donald Pleasence returned to play Dr. Loomis, in what would be one of his final film performances; according to Farrands, Pleasence was fond of the script. Danielle Harris, who was seventeen at the time, contacted producer Paul Freeman about reprising her role as Jamie Lloyd, and went so far as completing paperwork to become legally emancipated in order to shoot the film. She was officially cast in the role, but Dimension Films could not come to an agreement over her salary; Harris alleges that Dimension offered her a scaled $1,000 to shoot the part over the course of a week, which was less than the amount of money she had paid for her emancipation. Farrands and Freeman both had wanted Harris for the part, but at that point "had their hands tied."

According to Harris, the head of the casting department refused to negotiate her salary, stating that she was a "scale character who dies in the first twenty minutes." This ultimately led to her dropping out of the project. "People automatically assume I wanted some crazy amount of money, or something," Harris commented in 2014, "[but] it's not like I [was] demanding of anything, really ... When you've been asked to do something and then they insult you by saying, "You're a piece of shit, you die in the first act—I don't give a fuck that you were in two other Halloween movies, who cares?"... I was in shock." Actress J. C. Brandy was cast as Harris's replacement.

The producers initially wanted Brian Andrews to reprise his role as Tommy Doyle. However, with Andrews not having an agent, they were unable to contact him. Paul Stephen Rudd was cast in the part of Tommy, which marked his first starring role before he appeared in Clueless (1995). The leading female role, Kara, was given to Marianne Hagan; however, Hagan has since stated that Miramax executives Bob and Harvey Weinstein did not favor her for the part, and made aesthetic criticisms about her being "too thin" and her chin being "too pointy". Farrands, however, had wanted Hagan for the part because he felt she possessed an "every-girl" quality of having "lived a little, and had a hard time," and likened her screen presence to that of Jamie Lee Curtis. The filmmakers also approached Howard Stern to make a cameo appearance as the radio DJ Barry Sims, but he declined in order to appear in Private Parts.

For the role of Dr. Terence Wynn, Mitch Ryan was cast, based on his performance in Lethal Weapon (1987); Farrands originally urged the producers to cast Christopher Lee, having had the veteran horror actor in mind when writing the character. This is a reference on Carpenter's initial choice for role of Dr. Loomis during film making of Halloween from 1978 where he was offered that role, but declined due to low pay, only to regret it in later years. Denise Richards also auditioned for the part of Beth, but the studio passed on her, giving the role to Mariah O'Brien. Stunt performer George P. Wilbur, who portrayed Michael in the fourth installment, reprised his role as Michael Myers. However, once reshoots took place, Wilbur was replaced by A. Michael Lerner as director Joe Chapelle found Wilbur to be "too bulky."

Filming
Special effects artist John Carl Buechler created the mask for the film, which was based heavily on the mask featured in the poster for Halloween 4: The Return of Michael Myers. Buechler hand-crafted the mask over actor George P. Wilbur's face.

Filming began in fall of 1994 in Salt Lake City, Utah. Within the first week of shooting, however, the city experienced an early winter snowstorm, which complicated the production. As a result, several scenes which were supposed to take place on exterior locations had to be transferred to interiors. The original hospital scenes were shot at the abandoned Old Primary Children's Hospital in The Avenues section of Salt Lake City.

Producer Paul Freeman and director Chappelle reportedly rewrote the ending on-set, even from shot-to-shot as production deadlines loomed. Freeman also sent the crew home when crucial scenes needed to be shot; deleted scripted scenes indiscriminately; rewrote dialogue and action sequences; and assumed the responsibility of directing second-unit shots and the supervision of post-production of the original cut. These complications resulted in Dimension Films' parent company (and the film's co-production company) Miramax, taking over the film's production, and ordering many of the reworked sequences to be reshot.

Associated producer Malek Akkad explained the film's lack of a cohesive "vision" being the result of director Chappelle "answering" to the visions of the distributor, Dimension Films; Moustapha Akkad's production company, Nightfall Productions; and writer Daniel Farrands. Tensions between what Dimension, Nightfall, and Farrands envisioned for the film resulted in a finished product that had needed "more forethought," according to Akkad.

Reshoots

In early 1995, after filming and editing was completed, Halloween: The Curse of Michael Myers was given a test screening in New York City which, as described by actress Marianne Hagan, "consisted primarily of fourteen-year-old boys." During the Q&A afterward, one of the audience members expressed great displeasure at the ending of the film, which entailed a Celtic ritual and the passing on of the "Curse of Thorn" to the Dr. Loomis character. As a result of the audience's disapproval toward the film's finale, the movie was rushed back into production, this time without Donald Pleasence, who died on February 2, 1995. Pleasence had been in ill health during the shooting of the film.

Reshoots took place in Los Angeles, California in the summer of 1995. According to Farrands, the reshoots occurred with a new director of photography and spanned a total of four days. At this time, the Akkads were sidelined as Dimension Films took over the film. With only three months out from the film's release date, Farrands and Chappelle concurrently rewrote the script. Chappelle's revisions recharacterized Kara as a "machine gun-toting heroine", similar to "Linda Hamilton in Terminator 2: Judgment Day". Farrands dropped the recharacterization of Kara as well as "thunderous voices of God" added into a newly scripted climax. Meanwhile, a subplot involving a group of doctors seeking to harness "scientifically-engineered evil" was added into the rewrites and survived into the finished film. Farrands' pages would be dropped in favor for Rand Ravich, who previously rewrote Hellraiser: Bloodline for the studio and Chappelle just one month prior. The ending of the theatrical cut stems from Ravich's rewrites, which added an extended chase sequence, the higher body count, and Tommy Doyle's fight with Myers. However, Ravich's rewritten ending, which saw Tommy hoisting The Shape in the air with chains, was never fully adapted from the script. During the last night of filming, the crew were far behind schedule and decided to save on overtime payments, the yet-to-be-shot pages were scrapped entirely and instead the final shot of Michael's mask on the ground was done at the last minute.

A. Michael Lerner replaced George P. Wilbur in the role of Michael Myers, as the studio executives wanted him to appear less bulky. This resulted in continuity errors as the last third of the film features a slimmer Myers. Some of the additional footage incorporated into the finale of the film was shot at Queen of Angels Hospital in Los Angeles.

Post-production
In addition to the re-shoots prompted by the poor test screening, the film also underwent significant editing in post-production, resulting in brisker pacing and a "flashier" cinematic style that favored "blood and guts," but, according to Farrands, ultimately resulted in a "more confusing" movie. According to writer Farrands, the stylized flash cuts prominent in the final theatrical cut of Halloween: The Curse of Michael Myers were not originally intended, and he likened the style of the final product to an "MTV video rather than a Halloween film." Composer Alan Howarth similarly called the final product a "fix job," with numerous elements of the production being in flux both during and after principal photography. In addition to Howarth's score being redone, the film's sound design was also significantly altered from Howarth's original "minimalist" design.

Musical score

The original music score is composed and orchestrated by long-time Halloween contributor Alan Howarth, his work in the series dating back to his collaboration with John Carpenter on Halloween II. However, Howarth's score was redone by music editor Paul Rabjohns when the film went through reshoots. A soundtrack album was released by Varèse Sarabande, and is an unusual combination of the music featured in the original cut of the film, as well as that of the final theatrical cut. According to Howarth, he helped re-score the revised cut of the film, incorporating the use of guitar and drums in addition to the original score, which had been more synthesizer and piano-based. Howarth's official score for the film was released on August 24, 1995.

The music of Alabama-based rock band Brother Cane was featured throughout the movie. The music came from their 1995 release Seeds on Virgin Records. The album's hit single "And Fools Shine On" can be heard when Kara, Tim and Beth arrive at school in their car. The song is also heard during the closing credits. Three other Brother Cane songs (all from the Seeds album) are featured in the film: "Hung on a Rope", "20/20 Faith", and "Horses & Needles". "Disconnected" by the group I Found God is also featured in the film.

Track listing

Release
The film's troubled production resulted in two cuts of the film, which prompted a legal battle between the film's production company, Nightfall, who wanted to release the original cut, and its distributor, Dimension Films, who had incorporated reshoots and additional material. Ultimately, Dimension Films won the dispute, and their cut of the film was officiated for theatrical release.

An earlier teaser trailer of the film employed the title Halloween 666: The Origin of Michael Myers, which according to Daniel Farrands, came before an official title had been decided, and that the trailer title was a combination of an earlier script titled The Origin of Michael Myers by another writer, and Farrands' original script titled Halloween 666. At one point, executive producer Moustapha Akkad asked Farrands for a title, who suggested The Curse of Michael Myers due to the troubled production. Although Farrands's comment was in jest, Akkad took the name to heart and decided upon it. Farrands also added that this coincidentally made the subtitles similar to those in The Pink Panther films, which also used Return, Revenge, and Curse subtitles as Halloweens fourth, fifth and sixth films, respectively.

Box office
Halloween: The Curse of Michael Myers was released on September 29, 1995, in the United States, and brought in a $7,308,529 opening weekend gross, coming in second to serial killer thriller Seven, being the first film in the series to be on par with Halloween IIs opening weekend gross (both Halloween 4 and 5 had earned under $7 million). The film went on to gross a total of $15,116,634 at the U.S. box office, from an estimated $5 million budget.

Critical reception
The film was not screened in advance for critics. It has a 9% approval rating and an average rating of 3.52/10, based on 35 reviews, on the internet review aggregator Rotten Tomatoes. The sites critical consensus states "Halloween: The Curse of Michael Myers trades the simple, brutal effectiveness of the original for convoluted mysticism, with disastrously dull results." On Metacritic, the film holds a 10/100 based on 13 reviews, signifying as "overwhelming dislike". It is the lowest rated Halloween film on both sites.

Daniel Kimmel of Variety called the film "tired" and "run-of-the-mill", while Mick LaSalle of the San Francisco Chronicle said the film lacked suspense and said that "not even the presence of the late, gloriously histrionic Donald Pleasence can liven things up," deeming it "bland", "deadening", and "by far the worst in the series."

Stephen Holden of The New York Times called the film's script "impossibly convoluted", and wrote that "shock effects are applied with such hamfisted regularity that they quickly backfire." Josh Hartl of The Seattle Times criticized the film's conventionality, writing: "instead of sending up the current glut of serial-killer movies, the filmmakers trot out the old slasher tactics." Jack Mathews of the Los Angeles Times similarly criticized the film's lack of originality, comparing it negatively to its predecessors.

Richard Harrington of The Washington Post also criticized the script, writing: "While director Joe Chapelle and writer Daniel Farrands took advantage of a clearance sale at the Horror Cliche Emporium, they forgot to stop in at Plots R Us." The Time Out London film guide deemed the film "A series of competently engineered shock moments jollied along by a jazzed-up version of John Carpenter's original electronic score: slicker than crude oil and just as unattractive."

Home media
The film was first released for home media on VHS and LaserDisc on October 7, 1996, from Buena Vista Home Entertainment. A DVD followed on October 10, 2000. In January 2010, the film was released for the first time on Blu-ray in Canada from Alliance Films alongside Halloween H20: 20 Years Later and Halloween: Resurrection with no bonus material. The film was released on Blu-ray and again on DVD in the United States on May 10, 2011, by Echo Bridge Home Entertainment, once again with no bonus features.

Anchor Bay Entertainment and Shout! Factory once again released the film on Blu-ray on September 23, 2014, as a part of their 15-disc box set containing the entire series. This release also contained extensive bonus features, such as a commentary from writer Daniel Farrands and composer Alan Howarth, interviews with producers Malek Akkad and Paul Freeman, actresses Marian O'Brien, J. C. Brandy, and Danielle Harris, George P. Wilbur, makeup artists John Carl Buechler and Brad Hardin, as well as Howarth, in addition to deleted scenes and archival behind-the-scenes footage and interviews, and a tribute to Donald Pleasence. Lionsgate released yet another standalone Blu-ray on September 15, 2015, containing The Producer's Cut, but without any of the bonus features featured on the 15-disc release. On October 4, 2022, Shout! Factory reissued both the theatrical and Producer's Cut editions on 4K UHD Blu-ray in a box set also featuring Halloween H20: 20 Years Later and Halloween: Resurrection.

While the film was initially released on VHS in Australia with a rating of MA15+, the DVD was not released until October 8, 2014, with no extras.

Alternate versions
Halloween: The Curse of Michael Myers is notorious among Halloween fans for having multiple versions. The Producer's Cut is the best known; however, a Director's Cut also exists with footage cut by the MPAA. The theatrical version was the only version commercially available—with the Director and Producers cuts existing as low-quality bootlegs—until the Producer's Cut was included in the official Complete Collection box set released by Scream Factory and Anchor Bay Entertainment in 2014.

The Producer's Cut

The original cut of the film that screened for test audiences prior to the reshoots became known colloquially as The Producer's Cut, and bootlegged copies of it surfaced among film collectors. This cut of Halloween: The Curse of Michael Myers features numerous differences, ranging from different scores and musical cues to substantial shifts in plot, particularly regarding the film's conclusion. In a retrospective interview, Farrands noted that the finale in this cut of the film was sufficiently "creepy" and "Gothic," but conceded that it lacked intensity, which is largely what prompted Dimension Films to begin reshoots. The Producer's Cut of the film garnered a cult following, according to writer Farrands: "It's amazing the life that [Halloween: The Curse of Michael Myers] has continued to have because there is this alternate version that has been, kind of in-the-vault all these years."

In the finale of The Producer's Cut, Kara awakens at Smith's Grove Sanitarium on a concrete slab, surrounded by the cult's members, including Mrs. Blankenship, Wynn's secretary Dawn, the bus depot man, and Sheriff Holdt. Wynn conducts a ceremony in which Michael will kill Steven as a final sacrifice of innocent blood, after which the curse will pass on to Danny with Kara as his first sacrifice. Kara realizes that Steven is a product of incest between Jamie and Michael, and uses this to try to convince Michael not to kill the baby. This distracts everyone enough for Tommy to hold Wynn hostage and forces the cult to free Kara, and they run with the children through the sanitarium until they reach a locked gate.  Tommy uses the power of the ancient runes to stop Michael in his tracks, and Loomis helps the group escape. Later, after telling the others he has unfinished business, Loomis walks back into the sanitarium to find Michael lying on the floor of the main hallway. Upon removing the mask, Loomis finds Dr. Wynn, with whom Michael switched clothes and then escaped. Wynn dies, but not before saying "It's your game now, Dr Loomis", and passing on the Thorn symbol, which appears on Loomis' wrist; realizing that he himself is now to act as the leader of the cult, Loomis screams in both despair and disgust (this is heard as ambient noise in the final frame of the theatrical cut). As this happens Michael can be seen escaping into the night in Wynn’s clothes.

Another substantial difference in The Producer's Cut is the death of Jamie Lloyd: she does not die at the beginning of the film, but survives being stabbed by Michael in the barn. She remains in a coma and is taken to the hospital, where Loomis and Wynn visit her. Midway through the film, a "Gothic" montage occurs, which reveals in fragmented detail the conception of Jamie's child among the cult. After the sequence, an unseen person, later revealed to be Wynn, shoots the unconscious Jamie in the head with a silenced pistol. Additionally, John's death scene in The Producer's Cut was shorter; in the theatrical cut, an additional shot (completed during the reshoots) was incorporated of his head graphically exploding from an electrical power surge. Other various transitional shots throughout The Producer's Cut version were extracted or truncated in the theatrical cut.

The Producer's Cut remained officially unreleased for nearly 20 years. It had its first public exhibition on October 27, 2013, at the New Beverly Cinema in Los Angeles. Screenwriter Farrands was present for a short Q&A, in which he stressed that there was still a major push in the works to get this version a proper release. He also said that the studio allowing this version to be screened in public for the first time, and the overwhelmingly positive response, were both huge steps in the right direction. Anchor Bay Media and Scream Factory gave The Producer's Cut its first official release on Blu-ray in September 2014 as part of their Halloween: The Complete Collection box set.

A few select scenes from the Producer's Cut can be seen in the television version of the film. The scenes were re-inserted to increase the running time of the film.

References

Sources

External links
 
 
 
 
 
 

6
1995 films
1995 horror films
1990s serial killer films
1990s slasher films
American sequel films
American serial killer films
American slasher films
American supernatural horror films
1990s English-language films
Films about cults
Films about curses
Films about genetic engineering
Films about domestic violence
Films about dysfunctional families
Films directed by Joe Chappelle
Films scored by Alan Howarth (composer)
Films set in 1989
Films set in 1995
Films set in Illinois
Films shot in Utah
Films shot in Salt Lake City
Incest in film
Mad scientist films
Teenage pregnancy in film
Dimension Films films
Miramax films
Films about children
1990s American films
Films about mother–son relationships